Surface is the debut studio album from the band of the same name. Three years after releasing the midtempo boogie track "Falling in Love" on Salsoul, Surface released their first album self-produced and released in 1986 on Columbia Records. The album peaked at number 11 on the Billboard R&B albums chart and number 55 on the Billboard Top 200 albums chart. At the same time, the hit single "Happy" peaked at number 2 on Billboard Hot R&B/Hip-Hop Singles & Tracks. The other song, "Lately" peaked at number 8 on the Billboard singles chart.

Track listing

Personnel
Surface
Bernard Jackson - lead and backing vocals, bass guitar, guitars, synthesizer
David Townsend - synthesizers, acoustic piano, guitars, bass synthesizer, backing vocals
David "Pic" Conley - synthesizers, bass synthesizer, drum programming, percussion, flute, backing vocals

Charts

Weekly charts

Year-end charts

References

External links
 
 Surface at Discogs
 Facebook Page
 Soulwalking page
 Bio at R&B Haven
 Bio at AllThingsDeep

Columbia Records albums
1986 debut albums
Surface (band) albums